"Mood" is a 2018 song by the French singer Eva.

Charts

Certifications

References

2018 singles
2018 songs
French-language songs